Paige Leonhardt  (born 21 September 2000) is an Australian swimmer. She represented Australia at the 2016 Rio Paralympics and the 2020 Tokyo Paralympics, where she won a silver medal.

Personal

Leonhardt was born on 21 September 2000. At the age of five she was involved in a car accident that left her with severe injuries. She spent four years recovering. The accident left her with hemiplegia cerebral palsy on her right side as well as intercranial hypertension, epilepsy and autism. The intercranial hypertension means that she regularly needs to have excess fluid on the brain removed via a spinal tap. The calcium build-up behind her eyes causes drusen which will one day lead to a loss of eyesight. She now lives in Mount Cotton, Queensland, previously lived in Port Macquarie which is also the home of wheelchair rugby gold medallist Ryley Batt who is her idol. She previously attended St Joseph's Regional College in Port Macquarie but in 2019 she graduated from Carmel College, Thornlands.

Career
Leonhardt is classified as a S14 swimmer. She was previously classed as an S10 swimmer for athletes with physical impairment however the International Paralympic Committee deemed her very mild physical impairment to not meet the eligible criteria for inclusion in Paralympic sport. As she was deemed ineligible, she now competes in the S14 class for athletes with intellectual impairment. She took up squad swimming in March 2012 to assist her rehabilitation. At the 2013 McDonald's Queensland Multi Class Championships, she swam in 11 events and won seven gold and four silver medals. At the 2014 Australian Swimming Championships, she won the bronze medal in 50m Breaststroke Multi-class. At the 2015 Australian Swimming Championships, she won the bronze medal in 50m Breaststroke Multi-classand made the final of the 100m Breaststroke Multi-class. In multi-class events at the 2015 Australian Age Championships, she won silver in the 50m Breaststroke as well as bronze in the 50m Freestyle and 100m Freestyle. At the 2016 Australian Swimming Championships, she won bronze medal in the Women's 100m Breaststroke Multi-class in a personal best time of 1.21.31. This was the fourth fastest time clocked in the world this year. She also finished  fifth in the Women's 200m Medley Multi-class in a personal best time of 2.39.11 and seventh in the Women's 100m Butterfly Multi-class in 1.11.53.

She competed at the 2016 Rio Paralympics in six events. She qualified for the final in Women's 100m butterfly S10 finishing in sixth place and Women's 100m breaststroke finishing sixth. She also competed in the following events but didn't progress to the finals: Women's 50m freestyle S10, Women's 100m Freestyle S10, Women's 100m Backstroke S10 and Women's 200m Individual Medley SM10.

At the 2018 Commonwealth Games, Gold Coast, she won the silver medal in the Women's 100m Breaststroke SB9 and finished fourth in the Women's 100m Individual Medley SM10.

At the 2020 Tokyo Paralympics, Leonhardt won the silver medal in the Women's 100 m Butterfly S14 with a time of 1:05.48, less than 2 seconds behind Valeriia Shabalina of RPC who set a world record. She qualified for the finals of the Women's 100 m Breaststroke SB14 and Women's 200 m Individual Medley SM14 but could only manage sixth.

At the 2022 World Para Swimming Championships, Madeira, Leonhardt won three medals - gold in the Women's 100m Butterfly S14 and silver in the Women's 100 m breaststroke SB14 and Mixed 4 × 100 m Medley relay S14. She did not medal in two other events.

Leonhardt said "swimming is the only place where she feels like everyone else". In 2014, she jointly awarded the Junior Sportsperson (18 and under) at the Port Macquarie Hasting Sports Awards.

References

External links
 
 
 

Female Paralympic swimmers of Australia
Living people
2000 births
Swimmers at the 2016 Summer Paralympics
Swimmers at the 2020 Summer Paralympics
Medalists at the 2020 Summer Paralympics
Medalists at the World Para Swimming Championships
Paralympic silver medalists for Australia
Paralympic medalists in swimming
Cerebral Palsy category Paralympic competitors
S10-classified Paralympic swimmers
Commonwealth Games medallists in swimming
Commonwealth Games silver medallists for Australia
Swimmers at the 2018 Commonwealth Games
Swimmers with cerebral palsy
People from Redland City
Australian female breaststroke swimmers
Australian female medley swimmers
S14-classified Paralympic swimmers
21st-century Australian women
Medallists at the 2018 Commonwealth Games